Civil Service College (CSC) Singapore is a college for government employees in Singapore. It is a statutory board under the Public Service Division, Prime Minister's Office, of the Government of Singapore.

References

External links

2001 establishments in Singapore
Government agencies established in 2001
Civil service colleges
Higher education in Singapore
 Civil Service College